Carlyon Glacier is a large glacier which flows east-southeast from the névé east of Mill Mountain to the Ross Ice Shelf at Cape Murray. It was mapped in 1958 by the Darwin Glacier party of the Commonwealth Trans-Antarctic Expedition (1956–58), and named by the New Zealand Antarctic Place-Names Committee for R.A. Carlyon, who with Harry Ayres made up the party.

See also
Soyuz-17 Cliff
Yoshida Bluff

References
 

Glaciers of Hillary Coast